Doggy may refer to:

 Dog, a canine referred to as a "doggy" in baby talk
 Doggy style, a sex position

See also
 Dog (disambiguation)
 Doge (disambiguation)
 Dogg (disambiguation)